Calliotropis effossima is a species of sea snail, a marine gastropod mollusk in the family Eucyclidae.

Description
The height of the shell attains 10.5 mm.

Distribution
This species occurs in the Atlantic Ocean off the Cape Verdes.

References

External links
 To World Register of Marine Species

effossima
Gastropods of Cape Verde
Gastropods described in 1898